Anthanassa is a genus of North and South American butterflies of the family Nymphalidae found from the United States to South America. One authority places this genus as a subgenus of Phyciodes.

Species
Listed alphabetically:
 Anthanassa acesas (Hewitson, 1864)
 Anthanassa annulata Higgins, 1981
 Anthanassa ardys (Hewitson, 1864) – Ardys crescent, ardent crescent
 Anthanassa argentea (Godman & Salvin, [1882]) – chestnut crescent
 Anthanassa atronia (Bates, 1866) – brown crescent
 Anthanassa crithona (Salvin, 1871) – crithona crescent
 Anthanassa drusilla (C. & R. Felder, 1861) – orange-patched crescent
 Anthanassa dracaena (C. & R. Felder, [1867]) – notched crescent
 Anthanassa drymaea (Godman & Salvin, 1878) – weak-banded crescent
 Anthanassa frisia (Poey, 1832) – Cuban crescentspot, Cuban crescent
 Anthanassa frisia tulcis (H.W. Bates, 1864) – pale-banded crescent
 Anthanassa nebulosa (Godman & Salvin, 1878) – blurry crescent
 Anthanassa otanes (Hewitson, 1864) – Otanes crescent, cloud-forest crescent, Blackened crescent
 Anthanassa ptolyca (Bates, 1864) – black crescent
 Anthanassa sitalces (Godman & Salvin, [1882]) – montane crescent, pine crescent
 Anthanassa sosis (Godman & Salvin, 1878)
 Anthanassa texana (Edwards, 1863) – Texan crescent

References

Melitaeini
Nymphalidae of South America
Butterfly genera
Taxa named by Samuel Hubbard Scudder